Valentin Igor Fédéric Tanner (born 2 October 1992) is a Swiss curler. He currently plays lead for the Peter de Cruz team from Geneva.

Career
Tanner is the long-time lead for de Cruz. The team played in two World Junior Curling Championships, winning gold at the 2010 World Junior Curling Championships (defeating Scotland's Ally Fraser in the final) and a silver at the 2011 World Junior Curling Championships (losing to Sweden's Oskar Eriksson in the final). 2011 was the final year of junior eligibility for de Cruz. Even though Tanner could have played another two years of juniors, he stuck with de Cruz to play in men's events.

On the World Curling Tour, the team has won two events, the 2011 Curling Masters Champéry and the 2012 Challenge Casino de Charlevoix. During the 2012-13 curling season, the team played in three Grand Slam events, the 2012 ROGERS Masters of Curling (lost in a tie-breaker), the 2012 Canadian Open of Curling (1-4) and the National (1-4). The next season they played in one Slam, the 2013 Canadian Open of Curling (3-3).

In 2014, the de Cruz rink won their first Swiss championship, by defeating the Swiss Olympic team of Sven Michel in the final.

Personal life
Tanner currently works as a bartender.

References

External links

Living people
1992 births
Swiss male curlers
Sportspeople from Geneva
Swiss curling champions
Continental Cup of Curling participants
Curlers at the 2018 Winter Olympics
Olympic curlers of Switzerland
Olympic bronze medalists for Switzerland
Medalists at the 2018 Winter Olympics
Olympic medalists in curling
Curlers at the 2022 Winter Olympics
21st-century Swiss people